Pachylaelapsoides is a genus of mites in the family Pachylaelapidae. This genus has a single species, Pachylaelapsoides longipedis.

References

Acari